Coleman Creek is a  long 3rd order tributary to the Hyco River in Halifax County, Virginia.

Variant names
According to the Geographic Names Information System, it has also been known historically as:
Colemans Creek

Course
Coleman Creek rises about 0.25 miles northeast of Alton, Virginia, and then flows northeast to join the Hyco River about 3 miles southeast of Cluster Springs.

Watershed
Coleman Creek drains  of area, receives about 45.8 in/year of precipitation, has a wetness index of 407.40, and is about 52% forested.

See also
List of rivers of Virginia

References

Rivers of Virginia
Rivers of Halifax County, Virginia
Tributaries of the Roanoke River